Salma Shabana (born 8 October 1976 in Cairo, Egypt)  is the first female professional squash player from Egypt.  She reached a career high of No. 20 in September 2000.  She is the sister of former male PSA world No. 1 squash player, Amr Shabana.  She lives in Cairo with her husband Omar El Borolossy and has 3 children.

External links 
 
 

Egyptian female squash players
1976 births
Living people
Sportspeople from Cairo